In materials science, Schmid's law (also Schmid factor) describes the slip plane and the slip direction of a stressed material, which can resolve the most shear stress.

Schmid's Law states that the critically resolved shear stress is equal to the stress applied to the material multiplied by the cosine of the angle with the vector normal to the glide plane and the cosine of the angle with the glide direction. Which can be expressed as:

where  is known as the Schmid factor

The factor is named after Erich Schmid who coauthored a book with Walter Boas introducing the concept in 1935.

See also
Critical resolved shear stress

Notes

References

Further reading
Translation into English: 

Materials science